The Secretary is a play by the Irish writer James Sheridan Knowles. It premiered at the Theatre Royal, Drury Lane on 24 April 1843.  The cast included John Ryder as the King, George John Bennett as Duke of Gaveston, Samuel Phelps  as Lord Byerdale, William Macready as Colonel Green, Charles Selby as Armstrong, Helena Faucit as Lady Laura Gaveston and Leonora Wigan as Emmeline.

References

Bibliography
 Carlisle, Carol Jones. Helen Faucit: Fire and Ice on the Victorian Stage. Society for Theatre Research, 2000.
 Nicoll, Allardyce. A History of Early Nineteenth Century Drama 1800-1850. Cambridge University Press, 1930.

1843 plays
West End plays
British plays
Plays by James Sheridan Knowles